Sanford Greyhounds were a professional minor league baseball team that played periodically from 1919 until 1960. Throughout its entire existence the team played in the then-Class D Florida State League and was a charter member of the league.

Originally the Sanford Celeryfeds, in honor of the city's dominant crop – celery, the team's name changed several times over the years. The team has been known also as the Sanford Lookouts, Seminole Seminoles, Sanford Giants and the Sanford Blues.

The 1939 Lookouts were recognized as one of the 100 greatest minor league teams of all time.

Notable alumni

Baseball Hall of Fame alumni

 Early Wynn (1937) Inducted, 1972

Notable alumni

 Dale Alexander (1939) 1932 AL Batting Title

 Ben Cantwell (1926)

 Dick Green (1960)

 Ken Harrelson (1960) MLB All-Star

 Sid Hudson (1938-1939) 2 x MLB All-Star

References

Baseball teams established in 1919
Defunct Florida State League teams
New York Giants minor league affiliates
Kansas City Athletics minor league affiliates
St. Louis Cardinals minor league affiliates
Washington Senators minor league affiliates
Defunct baseball teams in Florida
Sports clubs disestablished in 1960
1919 establishments in Florida
1960 disestablishments in Florida
Baseball teams disestablished in 1960